The 2017 ABC Supply 500 was the 14th round of the 2017 IndyCar Series season. The race was held on August 20 at Pocono Raceway in Long Pond, Pennsylvania. Takuma Sato qualified on pole for the race, while Will Power managed to take victory despite being over a lap down at one point.

Qualifying

Qualifying was held on Saturday, August 19. Despite being the last driver on track, Takuma Sato qualified on pole position with a two lap time of 1:21.9526 (219.639 mph), besting Simon Pagenaud, Charlie Kimball, Tony Kanaan, and Will Power. It was Sato's second pole of the season.

The session was marred by two major crashes. Hélio Castroneves crashed heavily in turn one during his qualifying attempt, relegating him to a 20th place start. Later in the session, Ryan Hunter-Reay crashed heavily in turn three, then made further contact with the inside wall on the front stretch. Hunter-Reay suffered hip and leg injuries in the incident and was transported to Lehigh Valley Hospital–Cedar Crest in Allentown for examination. He was cleared to drive the following day, but was forced to start in 21st due to his incident.

Ed Carpenter made no attempt to qualifying after suffering damage to his car in a crash during the morning practice session.

Race

The race was held on Sunday, August 20. The start of the race saw Tony Kanaan launch into the lead with Alexander Rossi taking up second place behind. Takuma Sato, despite his pole start, began to quickly drop through the field. Several drivers who started farther back in the field, including Scott Dixon, Josef Newgarden, and Hélio Castroneves, began to work their way forward quickly in the opening laps as well. At the front of the field, the lead changed on lap 12, as Rossi managed to pass Kanaan. On lap 23, the first of the race's caution periods came out after Esteban Gutiérrez made contact with the turn 3 wall, causing parts of his rear wing to break off and land on the track. Gutiérrez would be forced to retire from the race from the damage sustained in the incident. During the caution, teams took the opportunity to make their first round of pit stops, with Rossi retaining the lead, but now with Will Power running second, Kanaan third, and Dixon fourth. During the stops, Max Chilton lost several laps after suffering from turbo-wastegate issues that required repair by his crew.

The restart came at lap 27, with Kanaan managing to sweep back into the lead while Power moved into second. Rossi struggled on the restart and by the end of two laps had fallen down to sixth place. On lap 30, the lead of the race changed hands again, as Dixon managed to move to the front of the field. By roughly 50 laps in, Dixon remained the leader, but the order behind continued to shuffle as Rossi moved up to second and James Hinchcliffe and Josef Newgarden moved into the top five. Green flag pit stops came around lap 55, but the top five remained largely unchanged. On lap 60, Rossi briefly took over the lead, before being re-passed by Dixon five laps later. Behind them, Power began to plummet down the order as the snap-adjuster on his front wing broke. Power eventually had to stop to have this fixed, placing him one lap down.

Up front, the battle for the lead became saw Hinchcliffe add his name to contention, as he, Dixon, and Rossi exchanged the lead several times over the next several laps. Another round of green flag pit stops came and went, but Hinchcliffe dropped well down the order after overshooting his pit stall. Replacing him in the battle for the lead was Ryan Hunter-Reay, despite his injuries sustained during qualifying. This battle continued to lap 116, when green flag pit stops came again. However, midway through the cycle, Sebastián Saavedra made contact with the turn two wall, bringing out another caution. Several drivers, including Newgarden and Castroneves, were caught out by the caution and forced to pit when everyone else had already stopped. After the stops, Hunter-Reay led Graham Rahal, Kanaan, Dixon, and Rossi. During the yellow flag, Power was able to get back onto the lead lap by not pitting during the caution.

Racing resumed on lap 122, with both Rahal and Kanaan passing Hunter-Reay, moving Rahal into the lead, the next lap, Kanaan took the lead. Behind them, the caution came again as Hinchcliffe and J. R. Hildebrand tangled in turn 1. During the caution, Power pitted again, partly to repair damage sustained while attempting to avoid the incident, and partly to top off on fuel. Kanaan and Rahal continued out front.

Racing resumed again on lap 132, with Rahal moving back around Kanaan for the lead. This began a battle between the two that saw them exchange the lead nearly every lap through lap 150. Many of the leaders pitted at this point, putting Will Power into the lead. Even after his pit stop on lap 161, Power maintained his lead over the field. One more round of pit stops remained, which Power emerged back out in front, while Newgarden and Rossi became the closest pursuers. However, Rossi suffered a broken fuel-nob, forcing him to remain in full-savings mode while Power and Newgarden went on ahead. In the closing laps, Newgarden managed to catch up to Power an attempt to make a pass, but eventually ran out of time, allowing Power to take his second consecutive win at Pocono. Rossi managed to hold onto third place, while the top five was rounded up by Simon Pagenaud and Tony Kanaan. Scott Dixon, who led the most laps of the race, finished sixth.

Power's victory moved him up to 8th in all time American open-wheel victories, while also allowing him to remain in championship contention. Newgarden, however, managed to extend his lead over everyone else thanks to his second-place finish, extending his point's lead to 18 points.

After the race, it was revealed that relations between Chip Ganassi Racing and its drivers had become heated after Max Chilton was parked by the team after completing only 129 laps of the race. While the car was three laps down, Chilton expressed extreme displeasure over the radio, saying, "[Whoever gave me] this instruction is brain dead. It's the first time I've had a decent car in a while. Why can't we learn, or are we a quitting team? Good riddance, [I] can't wait for next year."

Results

Qualifying

Source for individual laps:

Race

Notes
 Points include 1 point for leading at least 1 lap during a race, an additional 2 points for leading the most race laps, and 1 point for Pole Position.

Source for time gaps:

Championship standings

Driver standings

Manufacturer standings

 Note: Only the top five positions are included.

References

ABC Supply 500
ABC Supply 500
ABC Supply 500